The  Archdiocese of Karachi is a Latin Church ecclesiastical territory or archdiocese of the Catholic Church in Pakistan. It was erected on 20 May 1948 under as a then-suffragan diocese in the ecclesiastical province of the metropolitan Archdiocese of Bombay.

History
The Augustinians were the first to start a mission in the village of Kolachi in the 17th century. They were followed by the Discalced Carmelites who worked in the area until 1672. Around 1842–1843, the Carmelites once again attended to the spiritual needs of the British troops. The Capuchin order served from 1852 and then the Jesuits from 1856 to 1934. On June 1, 1934, it was declared a Mission under the Franciscans. It was elevated as the Archdiocese of Karachi on 15 July 1950 when the priests of the Archdiocese took over the management from the Franciscans.

Development
The seat of the Archdiocese is St. Patrick's Cathedral. The Christ the King seminary, the major seminary of the country is located in the Archdiocese.

The Archdiocese has contributed to the welfare of the country through its  schools, hospitals, orphanages and other institutions. In 1998, the Archdiocese of Karachi owned 17 English- and 46 Urdu-medium schools for some 40,000 students with about 1,700 teachers.

The Archdiocese has also produced a religious order for women known as the Franciscan Missionaries of Christ the King (FMCK) that founded schools, orphanages, homes for the aged and disabled and hospitals throughout the country and in India and Sri Lanka.

The Archdiocese publishes an Urdu-language weekly newspaper Agahi (knowledge) and an English-language weekly newspaper The Christian Voice, Karachi.

The Archdiocese celebrated its Golden Jubilee on 20 May 1998.

In 2000, the archdiocese had 18 parishes, 15 in the city of Karachi and one each in mission stations at Kotri, Khuzdar and Larkana. In 2009, the Archdiocese had 145 thousand faithful in a population of  15 million people.

Encouraged by Pope Benedict XVI's message for the World Day of Social Communications, wherein he affirms that "digital technologies are a gift for humanity that can be useful for spreading solidarity and understanding among people and populations", the Archdiocese launched a web-based television network Good News TV in February 2009. Father Arthur Charles, the Vicar General, is the CEO of Good News TV.

On 11 December 2009 the Archdiocese  lost its longest serving priest when Father D'Arcy D'Souza, 97, died in Holy Family Hospital. Fr. D'Arcy gave sixty six years of his life in the service of the Church.

In June 2018 Pope Francis made Archbishop Coutts a cardinal priest, assigning him the titular church of San Bonaventura da Bagnoregio.

Archbishops of Karachi 
 James Cornelius van Miltenburg, O.F.M. (1948–1958)
 Cardinal Joseph Marie Anthony Cordeiro (1958–1994)
 Simeon Anthony Pereira (1994–2002)
 Evarist Pinto (2004–2012)
 Cardinal Joseph Coutts (2012–2021)
 Benny Mario Travas (2021–present)

Churches in the diocese

Saint Patrick's Cathedral
Saint Michael's Church, Manzoor Colony 
Our Lady of Fatima Church
St. Jude's Church
St Paul’s Church, Azam Basti - St Paul's Parish
St. Lawrence’s Church
Sacred Heart Church, Keamari
St. Anthony’s Church
St. Francis’ Church
St. John’s Church, Drigh Road
St. Luke’s Church, Baldia
Christ the King Church
St. Peter’s Church, Akhter Colony
Saint Francis of Assisi Parish, Old Haji Camp
St John Marie Vianney Church, Mehmoodabad

Saint Francis of Assisi Parish, Karachi
The Saint Francis of Assisi Parish, located on Siddiq Wahab Road in the Old Haji Camp area, is a part of the Archdiocese.

The first parish priest, from July 1941 – 1944, was Fr. Liberius Pieterse. He later became known for his translation of the Bible into Urdu. For nearly 80 years, parish nuns have maintained a medical clinic and school for poor Pakistanis.

During the mid 1950s Fr. Simeon Anthony Pereira was appointed Parish Priest of the parish. Fr. Simeon went on to become the Archbishop of Karachi 

The parish also has a school attached to it.

St. Francis was the first parish to cater to the many people migrating from Punjab province to the city. The Jesuits and the  Franciscan Missionaries of Christ the King nuns started the migrant mission which still continues as Catholics pour in from the provinces.

Attack 

On 12 October 2012, the parish was attacked by a mob of 600 Islamic radicals that destroyed property in the yard, but failed to break down the front door. Saleem Khurshid Khokhar, a member of the Sindh Provincial Assembly, visited shortly after the attack and condemned violence against religious minorities.

In the media
The Archdiocese promotes the message of the Gospel through the following media:

 The Christian Voice, an English weekly
 Agahi, an Urdu news weekly 
 Good News TV, the Archdiocese satellite  television network

See also 
 List of Roman Catholic dioceses in Pakistan

References

External links 
 

Karachi
Karachi
1948 establishments in Pakistan
Religion in Karachi
A